Botanical gardens in Georgia have collections consisting entirely of Georgia native and endemic species; most have a collection that include plants from around the world. There are botanical gardens and arboreta in all states and territories of Georgia, most are administered by local governments, some are privately owned.
 Bakuriani Botanical Garden of The Ketskhoveli Institute of Botany of the Georgian Academy of Sciences
 Batumi Botanical Garden of the Georgian Academy of Sciences
 Tbilisi Botanical Garden of the Georgian Academy of Sciences
 Sukhumi Botanical Garden
 Zugdidi Botanical Garden

References 

Georgia
Botanical gardens